A basket is a container that is traditionally constructed from stiff fibers and can be made from a range of materials, including wood splints, runners, and cane. While most baskets are made from plant materials, other materials such as horsehair, baleen, or metal wire can be used. Baskets are generally woven by hand.  Some baskets are fitted with a lid, while others are left open on top.

Uses

Baskets serve utilitarian as well as aesthetic purposes. Some baskets are ceremonial, that is religious, in nature. While baskets are usually used for harvesting, storage and transport, specialized baskets are used as sieves for a variety of purposes, including cooking, processing seeds or grains, tossing gambling pieces, rattles, fans, fish traps, and laundry.

History

Prior to the invention of woven baskets, people used tree bark to make simple containers. These containers could be used to transport gathered food and other items, but crumbled after only a few uses. Weaving strips of bark or other plant material to support the bark containers would be the next step, followed by entirely woven baskets. The last innovation appears to be baskets so tightly woven that they could hold water.

Depending on soil conditions, baskets may or may not be preserved in the archaeological record. Sites in the Middle East show that weaving techniques were used to make mats and possibly also baskets, circa 8000 BCE. Twined baskets date back to 7000  in Oasisamerica. Baskets made with interwoven techniques were common at 3000 BCE.

Baskets were originally designed as multi-purpose vessels to carry and store materials and to keep stray items about the home. The plant life available in a region affects the choice of material, which in turn influences the weaving technique. Rattan and other members of the Arecaceae or palm tree family, the thin grasses of temperate regions, and broad-leaved tropical bromeliads each require a different method of twisting and braiding to be made into a basket. The practice of basket making has evolved into an art. Artistic freedom allows basket makers a wide choice of colors, materials, sizes, patterns, and details.

The carrying of a basket on the head, particularly by rural women, has long been practiced. Representations of this in Ancient Greek art are called Canephorae.

Figurative and literary usage
The phrase "to hell in a handbasket" means to deteriorate rapidly. The origin of this use is unclear.
"Basket" is sometimes used as an adjective for a person who is born out of wedlock. This occurs more commonly in British English.  "Basket" also refers to a bulge in a man's crotch.
The word “basket” is frequently used in the colloquial “don’t put all your eggs in one basket.” In this sense, the basket is a metaphor for a chance at success.

Materials

Basket makers use a wide range of materials:
Wicker
Straw
Plastic
Metal
Bamboo
Palm
Carbon fiber

Image gallery

See also

 Basket weaving
 Canephorae
 Weaving
 Native American basketry
 Native American basket weavers
 Baleen basketry
 Fruits Basket Japanese Manga series

References

Sources
Zepeda, Ofelia (1995). Ocean Power: Poems from the Desert. .

External links

Baskets, The Women's Committee of the Philadelphia Museum of Art
Baskets at the University of Michigan Museum of Art
Baskets at the Metropolitan Museum of Art
Exhibition: "A Measure of the Earth: The Cole-Ware Collection of American Baskets" at the Smithsonian American Art Museum
Study Lab: "Entwined with Life: Native American Basketry" at the Burke Museum of Natural History and Culture

 
Containers
Domestic implements
Food storage containers
Food packaging